A sports agent is a legal representative (hence agent) for professional sports figures such as athletes and coaches. They procure and negotiate employment and endorsement contracts for the athlete or coach whom they represent.

Description
Because of the unique characteristics of the sports industry, sports agents are responsible for communications with team owners, managers, and other individuals. Also, they are responsible for making recommendations. In addition to finding income sources, agents often handle public relations matters for their clients. In some large sports agencies, such as IMG, Creative Artists Agency, Roc Nation Sports and Octagon, agents deal with all aspects of a client's finances, from investment to filing taxes.

Sports agents may be relied upon by their clients for guidance in all business aspects, and sometimes even more broadly. For example, hockey agents start recruiting clients as young as 15, allowing the agent to guide the athlete's career before the NHL draft, which happens usually at 18 years of age.

Due to the length and complexity of contracts, many sports agents are lawyers or have a background in contract law. Agents are expected to be knowledgeable about finance, business management, and financial and risk analysis, as well as sports. It is important for a sports agent to follow trends in sports. Other skills an agent must possess are excellent communication and negotiation skills. Agents must be highly motivated, willing to work long hours, and capable of multitasking. It is very common for agents to be in negotiations on behalf of several clients at one time.

Some agents are part of large companies, and some are on their own. The number of clients an individual agent can handle and how many clients his or her employing agency can handle in total are interdependent variables.

Before the 1990s, most football players did not use agents. In some cases, they used their parents as agents. Because of most parents' naivety about the football business, these young footballers were often given less-than-stellar contracts by football clubs, which yielded lower salaries than they thought they deserved. In Sweden, there were only three licensed agents in 1995. As of 2002, there were 33.  According to FIFA, there were 5,187 licensed association football agents worldwide, with 600 agents in Italy alone. Since 2001, agents have not been licensed by FIFA. Instead, agents are now licensed directly by each association.

Sports agents generally receive between 4 and 15% of the athlete's playing contract, and 10 to 20% of the athlete's endorsement contract, although these figures vary. NFL agents are not permitted to receive more than 3%, and NBA agents not more than 4%, of their client's playing contracts.

Media depictions
Films such as Jerry Maguire, Two for the Money, and Any Given Sunday depicted sports agents. In England, ITV's Footballers' Wives included a female agent Hazel Bailey. The television show Ballers, which started in 2015, also shows a strong depiction of sports agents.

Notable sports agents

American football

 Tom Condon: co-head of Creative Artists Agency (CAA) Football. Clients include Peyton Manning (retired) and Tony Romo (retired).
 James "Bus" Cook: Clients include Brett Favre (retired), Jay Cutler (retired), and Calvin Johnson (retired).
 Ben Dogra: co-head of CAA Football. Clients include Adrian Peterson, Patrick Willis, and Joseph Addai.
 Jason Fletcher: former player turned agent.  Clients include Antonio Cromartie, Jamar Fletcher, Clinton Portis, Fabian Washington, and Darrell Bevell.
 Bob LaMonte:  founder and president of Professional Sports Representation. Current clients include Andy Reid, Jon Gruden, Sean McVay and Doug Pederson
 Joe Linta: In 2013, negotiated the richest contract in NFL history for Joe Flacco, despite the fact that he's never been picked for the Pro Bowl.
 Eugene E. Parker: negotiated the highest signing bonuses in NFL history for Emmitt Smith and Deion Sanders. Real-life inspiration for flamboyant character "Rod Tidwell" in the film Jerry Maguire.
 Bardia Ghahremani: Clients include Giovani Bernard, Nathan Shepherd, Jamie Gillan, and Tom Johnson.
 Alessio Sundas: agent and founder of Sports Man agency 
 Drew Rosenhaus: Clients include Plaxico Burress and Terrell Owens.
 Peter Schaffer: President of Authentic Athletix, LLC. Clients include including Joe Thomas, Phil Taylor, Barry Sanders, Trevor Pryce, Joshua Cribbs, C. J. Anderson, Mario Edwards Jr., and Hakeem Nicks. and PGA golfers including two-time PGA tour winner Jonathan Kaye and Shane Bertsch.
 Joel Segal: President of Lagardère Unlimited Football. Clients include Eric Fisher, Reggie Bush, Santonio Holmes and Chris Johnson.
 Jimmy Sexton, Co-Head of Football and Head of Coaching as a sports agent for Creative Artist Agency. Clients include Sam Darnold, Julio Jones, Laremy Tunsil and Derrick Henry.
 Alexa Stabler-Adams:  Owner of Stabler Sports, daughter of the late NFL quarterback Ken Stabler. Currently represents JK Scott.  
 Leigh Steinberg: Clients include Troy Aikman and Ben Roethlisberger. Real-life inspiration for fictional sports agent Jerry Maguire in the film of the same name (has a cameo appearance in the movie).
 Don Yee: Clients include Tom Brady and Jimmy Garoppolo.

Australian football
 Ricky Nixon: former player, who was the AFL's first full-time player manager

Baseball 

 Barry Axelrod: Clients included Jeff Bagwell, Craig Biggio, Rick Sutcliffe, and executive Kevin Towers.
 Scott Boras: Clients include Alex Rodriguez and Prince Fielder.  Boras is known to have negotiated the highest contracts in Major League Baseball history and the history of sports.
 Casey Close: Clients include Derek Jeter and Ryan Howard.
 Greg Genske: Successor in sports agency formerly run by Jeff Moorad (baseball) and Leigh Steinberg (football).
 Randy Hendricks: Partnered with his brother, Allan; they sold their firm to SFX (now Live Nation), and bought it back again.
 Joe Kehoskie: Small agency; frequently quoted by media regarding Cuban defectors and baseball in Latin America.
 Sam & Seth Levinson: Clients include David Wright and Jon Lester.
 Bo McKinnis: Clients include David Price.
 Jim Munsey: Clients include Sam Fuld, Jarrod Saltalamacchia, and Sean Burnett.
 Lonnie Murray: Clients include Bruce Maxwell; first Black woman agent certified by the MLB Players Association.
 Burton Rocks: Clients include Kip Wells, Jim Riggleman, Mike Easler, Robinson Cancel, Dave Eiland, Paul DeJong, Joe Oliver
 Matt Sosnick: Clients include Dontrelle Willis. Sosnick is subject of the book License to Deal by Jerry Crasnick.
 Arn Tellem: Clients have included Albert Belle, Mike Mussina, and Chase Utley. Also a basketball agent (see below).
 Joe Urbon: Clients include Jason Bay and Grady Sizemore.

Basketball

 Rich Paul co-owner of Klutch Sports Group with LeBron James. Clients include LeBron James, Anthony Davis, John Wall and Ben Simmons
 Jeff Austin is head of Octagon's basketball division, and was ranked 11th in the "12 Best Sport Agents in the World" in 2010 by Business Insider. His clients include David Robinson, Moses Malone, Kirk Hinrich, Stephen Curry and Jimmer Fredette.
 Doug Davis: Clients include Metta World Peace and Roger Mason Jr.
 Bill Duffy: Clients include Rajon Rondo, Joakim Noah, Greg Oden, Yao Ming, Klay Thompson, and Steve Nash.
 David Falk: Currently semi-retired. Past clients included Michael Jordan, Patrick Ewing, Allen Iverson, and Dikembe Mutombo. In the 1990s, was generally considered the most influential player agent in the NBA.
 Dan Fegan: Noted for creating several nuances in the most recently expired NBA Collective Bargaining Agreement. Clients include John Wall, Dwight Howard and Ricky Rubio.
 Aaron Goodwin: Terminated by LeBron James, Dwight Howard, Al Horford, and Jamal Crawford. Goodwin now represents over 20 NBA players. 
 Roger Montgomery: Works for Jay-Z and his company Roc-Nation. Managed Desmond Mason, Maurice Evans and Jeremy Lin.
 Rob Pelinka: Former basketball player at the University of Michigan and graduate of their law school; worked as an agent before becoming general manager of the Los Angeles Lakers. Past clients include Kobe Bryant and Carlos Boozer.
 Ticha Penicheiro: 2019 inductee of the Women's Basketball Hall of Fame as a player; currently an agent with about 30 clients, among them Kayla McBride and Courtney Vandersloot.
 Leon Rose: Former agent of LeBron James.
 Arn Tellem: Clients include Tracy McGrady, Jermaine O'Neal, Pau Gasol, and Joe Johnson. His clients' total salaries in 2007–08 season added up to more than $210 million. Tellum left the agent business to become President of the Detroit Pistons.

Cricket
 Neil Fairbrother: Former England cricket player, now Director of Cricket at International Sports Management.  Clients include: Andrew Flintoff, Marcus Trescothick, Steve Harmison.

European basketball
 Miško Ražnatović: Serbian agent. Through his agency (BeoBasket), he mostly represents European basketball players and coaches as well as American players playing in Europe. He represents many highest paid European basketball stars in Euroleague. His notable clients include Nikola Peković, Mirza Teletović, coach Dušan Ivković, Vassilis Spanoulis, Nenad Krstić, Dario Šarić, DeMarcus Nelson, Joffrey Lauvergne, Duško Savanović, Pero Antić, Aleksandar Ćapin, Marko Kešelj, Nihad Đedović, Novica Veličković, Milenko Tepić, Aleksandar Rašić, Raško Katić, İlkan Karaman, Emir Preldžić, Marko Simonović, Andrija Žižić, etc. Ražnatović was additionally involved in the Deron Williams' transfer to Beşiktaş during the 2011 NBA lockout and owns a basketball club KK Mega Vizura that competes in the Basketball League of Serbia.
 Craig McKenzie: American basketball agent. Worked for Eugene E. Parker on Deion Sanders. At 27, was one of youngest agents ever to have lottery pick in Bonzi Wells. Clients included three-sport athlete Charlie Ward, and American International Basketball stars Marcus Brown, JR Bremer, Demond Mallet and Mire Chatman, some of the highest paid players in Europe at one time.
 Zoran Savić: Serbian agent. Through his agency (Invictus Sports Group), Barcelona-based Savić represents coach Xavi Pascual, Milan Mačvan, coach Žan Tabak, Dalibor Bagarić, Ivan Opačak, etc.

Association football
 Jorge Mendes: Portuguese agent. Founder of GestiFute. Clients include Cristiano Ronaldo, Radamel Falcao, David de Gea, Diego Costa, Renato Sanches, Ricardo Quaresma, Deco, Nani, Ángel Di María and managers José Mourinho, Aitor Karanka and Luiz Felipe Scolari.
 Pini Zahavi: Israeli agent. Handled deals involving the transfers of Carlos Tevez, Yakubu and Rio Ferdinand.
 Bila Kanza: English-based French Sports Agent and founder of LKI – Lonrisk International Management.
 Paul Stretford: English agent. Clients include, Wayne Rooney. Set up Triple S Sports Entertainment Group in 2009 after leaving Proactive Sports, which he originally established.
 Constantin Dumitraşcu: French-based Romanian agent. His agency (Mondial Sports Management) include Edinson Cavani, Alexandre Pato, Hatem Ben Arfa, Fernandinho, Nemanja Matić, Douglas Costa and Philippe Coutinho.
 Milan Ćalasan: Serbian agent. His agency (Mondialvas) represented Christian Karembeu, manager Arsène Wenger and Nikola Žigić.
 Claes Elefalk: Swedish agent. Clients include Freddie Ljungberg, Pontus Farnerud, and Nils-Eric Johansson, plus several NHL ice hockey players.
 Roger Ljung: Former Swedish international player, owns his own agency (Roger Ljung Promotion AB). Represented Freddie Ljungberg until 2006. Clients include Marcus Allbäck, Daniel Andersson, Patrik Andersson, Erik Edman, Andreas Isaksson, Kim Källström, Marcus Lantz and Teddy Lučić.
 Martin Dahlin: Former Swedish international player; works for Roger Ljung Promotion AB
 Dirk Hebel: Former German footballer, owns his own agency (Fussballmarkt). Has represented Mario Götze, Sunday Oliseh, Goran Sablić and Patrick Weiser.
 Abdilgafar "Fali" Ramadani: Macedonia-born, Germany-based Albanian agent. His agency (LIAN Sports) that he co-owns with Nikola Damjanac represents players either from or with family ties to former Yugoslavia such as Stevan Jovetić, Lazar Marković, Adem Ljajić, Zvjezdan Misimović, Haris Seferovic and Marko Marin.
 Barry Silkman: English agent. Clients include David Villa, Demba Ba and Ravel Morrison.
 Zoran Stojadinović: Serbian agent.
 Paschalis Tountouris: International agent of Greek origin and founder of Prosport. Clients include Giorgos Karagounis, Dimitris Kolovos, Fiorin Durmishaj, Knowledge Musona, Kostas Tsimikas youngs stars Marios Vrousai, Anastasios Chatzigiovanis and manager Yannis Anastasiou.
 Walter Palombo: Swiss-based Italian sports advisor, and the founder of Palombo Consulting. His notable clients are Andy Carroll, Jack Wilshere, Jermaine Pennant and Jermain Defoe in the Premier League.
 Kevin Davies: Former English international player, owns his own agency: KCD Management.
 Rhydian Thomas: Wales-based sports agent. Founder and owner of GSF Agency, which he set up in 2015, having previously founded Complete Sports Management (CSM), which ran from 2001, managing international rugby union players. GSF agency covers South Wales and the West Country, identifying the best academy talent in the region. Notable clients include Sam Pearson. GSF Agency Web

Golf
 Mark Steinberg: Clients include Tiger Woods; former head of golf division at IMG.
 Andrew Chandler: Former European Tour golfer.  Clients include golfers Lee Westwood, Ernie Els, Darren Clarke, Louis Oosthuizen, Charl Schwartzel, and Christina Kim. Rory McIlroy was a client of Chandler until October 2011, when he left for Dublin-based Horizon Sports Management.

Ice hockey
 Mike Barnett: former agent of Wayne Gretzky, Brett Hull, Paul Coffey, Jaromír Jágr, Joe Thornton, Lanny McDonald, Sergei Fedorov, Alexander Mogilny, Owen Nolan, Mats Sundin and Dany Heatley. 
 Ritch Winter: over 70 clients.
 Gilles Lupien: former NHL defenceman; current Canadian ice hockey agent. Clients include Roberto Luongo.
 Don Meehan: president of Newport Sports Management. Over 100 clients in the NHL, including Jarome Iginla, Steven Stamkos, P. K. Subban and Chris Pronger.
 Tatiana Ovechkina, two-time basketball gold medalist, is her son Alexander Ovechkin's agent. She brokered a 13-year, $124 million contract.
 Allan Walsh in 2004 merged his hockey representation with Octagon Hockey. His clients include Marc-André Fleury, Patrik Eliáš, Martin Havlát and Milan Michálek.
 Pat Brisson – agent of Sidney Crosby, among others

Motorsport
 Alan Miller:  Jimmie Johnson
 Keke Rosberg: JJ Lehto and Mika Häkkinen, also managed son Nico Rosberg between 2006 and 2008
 Nicolas Todt: Felipe Massa
 Willi Weber: Primarily Michael Schumacher

Olympics
 Peter Carlisle: Clients include Michael Phelps, Natalie Coughlin, Apolo Ohno, Seth Wescott and Chris Klug.

Notable former sports agents

 Colleen Howe (deceased): ice hockey, late president of Power Play International and Power Play Publications managing hockey careers and business interests of her husband Gordie Howe and their sons Marty and Mark Howe.
 Camilo Marin (deceased): Cuban-born horse racing agent.  Clients included Laffit Pincay Jr., Braulio Baeza, Jorge Velásquez and Manuel Ycaza.
 Mark McCormack (deceased): American golf agent, and principal originator of modern sports agency industry. First client was Arnold Palmer. Founded IMG (originally "International Management Group").
 Jeff Moorad: Former baseball agent and former partner of Leigh Steinberg, now baseball executive and part-owner of San Diego Padres.
 Rob Pelinka: Former basketball player at the University of Michigan. Clients include Kobe Bryant, Carlos Boozer, and Buddy Hield. Pelinka stepped down from being an agent to be run the Los Angeles Lakers in March 2017.
 Charles C. Pyle (deceased): American football; clients included Red Grange and Wildcat Wilson; founder of first American Football League (1926).
 Mino Raiola (deceased): Dutch-based Italian association football agent. His notable clients included Paul Pogba, Zlatan Ibrahimović, Mario Balotelli, and Pavel Nedvěd.
 Gary Wichard (deceased): American football, three dozen clients, the inspiration for the movie Jerry Maguire.

Sports agency groups
There have been some efforts to transform the sports agency business from an individual, entrepreneurial business, to more of a corporate structure.  These experiments met with varying degrees of longevity and success.

 Allegiant Athletic Agency – representing NBA and NFL players
 Creative Artists Agency: "CAA" – acquired various pieces of the sports agency business of SFX (see below), starting with football.
 IMG – International Management Group – corporate agency established by entrepreneur Mark McCormack, originally with a specialization in golf and tennis.  After the death of McCormack the company was acquired by private equity group Forstmann Little.
 Infront - international sports rights vendor, representing Serie A, FIFA, and others.
 International Sports Management – British sports agency run by former European Tour golfer Andrew "Chubby" Chandler.
 Interperformances – International full-service sports agency, specializing in the basketball market. In January 2017, the company expanded in the United States with intentions of developing into areas beyond basketball; it is known as InterperformancesUSA (IPZ).
 Octagon Worldwide – Full-service sports agency and event marketing group, traded with advertising and marketing companies in the Interpublic Group.
 Priority Sports and Entertainment- Agency representing the most NBA players, run by Mark Bartelstein.
 Quantum Sport- Agency founded by Marco Gabbiadini and solicitor, James Welch, representing footballers, cricketers, rugby players and MMA fighters. Cathal Pendred heads the MMA division. 
 Roc Nation Sports – sports agency founded in 2013 by Shawn Carter, better known as Jay-Z. Currently in partnership with CAA; first client signed was Robinson Canó.
 Rosenhaus Sports- sports agency run by Drew Rosenhaus.
 Sponsoo - globally operating digital marketplace for sport sponsorship, also servicing smaller clubs and athletes.
 Sportfive, formerly Lagardère Sports and Entertainment – international sports agency, sports consulting and event management, active in the football, tennis and golf markets.
 Sports Management Worldwide – international sports agency and private for-profit sports management training institution, founded and run by Dr. Lynn Lashbrook.
 Wasserman Media Group (WME) _ acquired Arn Tellem's basketball agency from SFX, and usually represents the most players in NBA lottery draft each year.
 Independent Sports and Entertainment (ISE) –  sports agency which tries to mix athletes into the world of entertainment and film.
 Imago Sports Management _ Imago Sports Management is a Bangladeshi talent and sports based agency.

Formerly active agencies
Some sports agency firms were once prominent, but are now gone or reorganized:

 Assante Corporation – Canadian public company that acquired the Steinberg, Moorad & Dunn agency, then acquired other than agencies including Dan Fegan & Associates and Maximum Sports Management in an unsuccessful effort to build multi-sport corporate agency.
 SFX Entertainment (now Live Nation, a publicly traded company) –  in 1998 SFX agreed to pay up to $150 million in cash, stock, and bonuses for F.A.M.E., the sports agency run by David Falk, the agent for basketball players Michael Jordan and Patrick Ewing. SFX also acquired two other major sports agencies, Arn Tellem's agency (Tellem & Associates) and the baseball-oriented firm run by Randy Hendricks and Allan Hendricks. SFX would later reverse course, and sell off the pieces of its large sports agency business.
 Steinberg, Moorad & Dunn ("SMD") – a multi-sport agency sold in October 1999 for reported $120 million to Canadian financial firm.  Defections of principals, and litigation, followed.  Originally led by entrepreneurial agents Leigh Steinberg and Jeff Moorad.

See also
 Entertainment Law
 Talent agent - The discussion of the agents that represent entertainment talent and may also participate in sports agency.

References

Further reading
 How to Play the Game: What Every Sports Attorney Needs to Know, by Darren Heitner, 2014, ABA Book Publishing, 
 The Business of Sports Agents, by Kenneth L. Shropshire, Timothy Davis, 2008, University of Pennsylvania Press, 
 License to Deal: A Season on the Run with a Maverick Baseball Agent, by Jerry Crasnick, 2005, Rodale Books, 
 An Athlete's Guide to Agents: 5th Edition, by Bob Ruxin with Darren Heitner, 2009, Jones and Bartlett, 
 How To Be A Sports Agent, by Mel Stein, 2008, High Stakes Publishing, 
 The Football Agent, by Knut Høibraaten, 2015, HHH Forlag, 

Business occupations
Agent